Picnic Point is a census-designated place (CDP) located in Snohomish County, Washington. The population was 8,809 at the 2010 census. It was formerly part of the Picnic Point-North Lynnwood CDP.

Geography
Picnic Point is located at coordinates 47°51'37"N 122°17'40"W. The elevation is 79 feet.

Picnic Point Park, located on the Puget Sound coastline, offers access to the beach as well as views of the sound, Whidbey Island, and the Olympic Mountains.

References

Census-designated places in Snohomish County, Washington